Andhra Pradesh State Wakf Board or A.P. State Wakf Board, generally called the Muslim Wakf Board, is a constituted Board established by the 1954 Central Act to look after the exclusive affairs of Muslim Wakf properties, Wakf institutions and  Muslim Marriage Records of the Muslim community of Andhra Pradesh, India. It is generally known and writes under the name and style of Muslim Wakf Board.

The first and foremost A.P State Wakf Board chairman was Mr. Syed Ahamed Ali (Alhaj Syed Ahamed Ali) during the time of the then C.M Mr. N.T.Rama Rao. Mr. Ahamed Ali who was initially a businessman worked very efficiently during his tenure as Wakf Board Chairman. He was a key person in establishing Imdad Ghar in Vijayawada which is now a major source of revenue for Wakf Board in Vijayawada. 

Mr Khadar Basha is the present chairman of the board, he was elected on 28 February 2022.

It was formerly known as Umoor-E-Mazhabi established in 1396 and Fasli during the Nizams rule in Hyderabad State.

History
Muslim Wakf Board was constituted under provisions of Wakf Act in July 1996. Andhra Pradesh has the distinction of being the first state in India to have framed elections rules under this Act and conducted elections and, thus, the A.P.S. Wakf Board has the distinction of being the first board in the country to have been constituted under the provisions of the new Act. Under the provisions of Wakf Act 1995 the Wakf Board is a corporate body having perpetual succession.

Administration

During Nizams

His Exalted Highness the Nizam of Hyderabad promulgated a regulation of 1349 Fasli, known as Hyderabad Endowment Regulations under which a Nazim Umoor E Mazhabi (Director, Ecclesiastical Department) was appointed to supervise Wakf administration on behalf of the government. These regulations though brief, provided for every important aspect of Wakf administration in the erstwhile Hyderabad government. It contained 16 sections and provided for registration of Wakf properties, maintenance of Kitab Ul Awqaf (Wakf Register) (S3-11) in the prescribed manner by the Nazim.

The unique feature of the Hyderabad Endowment Regulations, 1349 Fasli was its secular character which provided for registration and the supervision of not only the Hindu and Muslim Wakfs but endowments of all religions. Therefore, the rules made under these regulations were very exhaustive,  numbering about 525.

Properties

Welfare activities
The Muslim Wakf Board of A.P. looks after the benefits of Muslim residents of Hyderabad and in general Andhra Pradesh. They organize mass marriages of Muslims communities' poor people. They provide or sponsor vocational technical training for Muslim youths.

The Muslim Wakf Board sponsors orphanages in many cities of A.P. The most famous one is Anees-ul-Gurba, an orphanage at Nampally, Hyderabad.

Encroachment
In Telangana alone, more than 55000 Acres of land out of 77000 acres have been encroached by miscreants. Most of the huge projects came up near IT Corridor in Hyderabad, belongs to waqf, prime example, Lanco Hills. Telangana Waqf Board is trying to digitise the waqf land records and Telangana State government is also taking measures to protect the waqf land. Recently, Telangana Government has banned registration of waqf and endowment lands.

Protecting Organisation
Many organisation such as Shia Companions wakf protection front and others are working voluntary to protect the renaming wakf land and taking measures to restore the encroached endowed land.

References

External links
 AP Wakf properties

Islam in India
Organisations based in Andhra Pradesh
Muslim politics in India
1996 establishments in Andhra Pradesh